Andell Anwer Loubser (born ) is a South African rugby union player for the  in the European Challenge Cup and Currie Cup. His regular position is Fullback or Wing. He is very versatile and his kicking ability is world class.

Loubser was born in Hopefield, but finished his schooling at Hoërskool Menlopark in Pretoria. He played in all six of South Africa Schools' matches in those seasons, scoring two tries in his first match against France.

In 2019, Loubser moved to Port Elizabeth to join the  Pro14 franchise.

References

South African rugby union players
Living people
1997 births
People from Saldanha Bay Local Municipality
Rugby union fly-halves
Rugby union wings
Rugby union fullbacks
Blue Bulls players
Southern Kings players
Rugby union players from the Western Cape
Cheetahs (rugby union) players
Free State Cheetahs players